Burundi sent a delegation to compete at the 2008 Summer Paralympics in Beijing, People's Republic of China. It was Burundi's first ever participation in the Paralympic Games. According to official records, the following three athletes competed in the games:

Athletics

3 competitors:

Men

See also
Burundi at the Paralympics
Burundi at the 2008 Summer Olympics

External links
International Paralympic Committee

References

Nations at the 2008 Summer Paralympics
2008
Summer Paralympics